This is a list of the main association football rivalries in the Netherlands.

 Amsterdamse Derby's: Ajax (Southeast) vs. FC Blauw-Wit (Southwest) vs. DWS (West) vs. De Volewijckers (North)
 Betuwse Derby: FC Lienden vs SV TEC
 Brabantse Derby's:
 (Grote) Brabantse Derby: PSV vs. NAC Breda
 (Midden-)Brabantse Derby: Willem II vs. RKC Waalwijk
 (Noordoost-)Brabantse Derby: TOP Oss vs. FC Den Bosch
 (West-)Brabantse Derby: Willem II vs. NAC Breda
(Zuidoost-) Brabantse Derby: FC Eindhoven vs. Helmond Sport
 De Klassieker: Ajax vs. Feyenoord
 De Topper: Ajax vs. PSV	
 De Kraker: PSV vs. Feyenoord
 Derby van het Noorden: FC Groningen vs. SC Heerenveen
 Derby van het Zuiden: MVV Maastricht vs. Fortuna Sittard
 Dorpsderby: IJsselmeervogels vs. SV Spakenburg
 Drents-Groningse Derby II– FC Groningen vs. FC Emmen
 Friese Derby: SC Heerenveen vs. SC Cambuur
 (Grote)Noord-Hollandse Derby: Ajax vs. AZ
 Rijnmondderby: FC Dordrecht vs. Feyenoord or Sparta Rotterdam or Excelsior
 Rotterdamse Derby's: Feyenoord (South) vs. Sparta Rotterdam (West) vs. Excelsior (East)
 Zuid-Hollandse Derby: Feyenoord vs. ADO Den Haag
 (Kleine)Noord-Hollandse Derby: FC Volendam or Telstar vs. Ajax or AZ
 Gelderse Derby's: Vitesse vs. N.E.C. or De Graafschap
 Vissersderby: FC Volendam vs. Telstar
 Hofstad vs. Hoofdstad: ADO Den Haag vs. Ajax
 IJsselderby: PEC Zwolle vs. Go Ahead Eagles
 Katwijk Derby: Quick Boys vs. VV Katwijk	
 Overijsselse Derby: PEC Zwolle vs. FC Twente or Heracles Almelo
 Lichtstad Derby: PSV vs. FC Eindhoven	
 Noord-Hollandse Derby: Ajax vs. AZ vs. Telstar vs. FC Volendam	
 Overijsselse Derby: PEC Zwolle vs. FC Twente
 Rotterdamse Derby's: Feyenoord (South) vs. Sparta Rotterdam (West) vs. Excelsior (East) vs. Xerxes (North)
 Twentse Derby: Heracles Almelo vs. FC Twente
 Zuid-Hollandse Derby: Feyenoord vs. ADO Den Haag vs. SVV vs. FC Dordrecht	
 Gelderse Derby's: 
 (Grote)Gelderse Derby: Vitesse vs. N.E.C. 
 (Kleine)Gelderse Derby: De Graafschap vs. Vitesse or N.E.C.
 Lichtstadderby: PSV vs. FC Eindhoven	
 Derby tussen Noord- en Zuid-Limburg: VVV-Venlo vs. MVV Maastricht or Fortuna Sittard or Roda JC Kerkrade	
 Derby van het Zuiden: MVV Maastricht vs. Fortuna Sittard
 Markermeer Derby: 
Almere City FC vs. SC Telstar
 Markermeerderby: Almere City FC vs. FC Volendam
 Limburgse Derby: 
Roda JC vs. VVV-Venlo
Roda JC Kerkrade vs. MVV Maastricht
 Mijnstreekderby: Roda JC Kerkrade vs. Fortuna Sittard

References

Football in the Netherlands